Alif the Unseen is a 2012 cyberpunk fantasy novel by American writer G. Willow Wilson. In the novel, a Middle Eastern hacker named Alif discovers a book of djinn tales which may lead to a new age of quantum computing. The novel won the 2013 World Fantasy Award for Best Novel.

Plot Summary
In an unnamed Middle Eastern security state, the hacker Alif discovers that his love interest Intisar is entering an arranged marriage with another man. He creates a computer program, Tin Sari, to identify Intisar’s digital footprint and block her from seeing him online. Alif’s computer is attacked by The Hand, a prince who seeks to identify and imprison dissidents. The Hand is also Intisar's fiancé. Unable to contact Alif online, Intisar sends him a book.

Alif is stalked by secret police, causing him to flee with his neighbor Dina. They seek out a gang leader named Vikram the Vampire for protection. They are rescued by two djinn: Vikram and his sister Azalel, who had been living as Alif and Dina's housecat. Vikram reveals that Intisar’s book, the Alf Yeom, is a collection of djinn tales containing powerful secrets.

They meet a convert who specializes in antique books, and they learn that The Hand is seeking the Alf Yeom. Dina, the convert, Alif, and Vikram seek shelter from the police in a mosque. Alif decodes the Alf Yeom and attempts to create a quantum computer. Dina and the convert escape, Vikram is killed, and Alif is captured and interrogated by The Hand. Months later, he is rescued by NewQuarter01, a prince and hacker. Alif learns that his public arrest has become a cause célèbre for anti-regime activists.

Alif reunites with Dina and the convert in the djinn city of Irem. Vikram died during the escape, but the convert is pregnant with his child; she uses this status to assure the cooperation of Vikram's allies. In the City, The Hand’s attempt to replicate Alif’s quantum computer has failed, leading to massive Internet outages and riots in the streets. Alif uses Tin Sari to counteract the Hand’s control of the City’s infrastructure and restore Internet Access to the City, further assisting the rioters. As Alif's djinn allies battle The Hand's, The Hand is identified and lynched by rioters. Alif and Dina escape.

Reception
Alif the Unseen received positive reviews. The New York Times described it as a genre-defying work, with elements of fantasy, dystopian fiction, techno-thriller, and Islamic mysticism. The Times called the novel "a resounding, heterodox alternative" to American fiction which is often safe and provincial. Publishers Weekly praised the juxtaposition of Arab mythology and modern-day computer theory, as well as the novel's exploration of the cultural conflicts between the East and the West. This was echoed by other reviews, which praised the way in which the novel combined the threads of technology and religion. Others praised the novel's handling of relevant societal concerns, as well as Wilson's storytelling and characterization. Salon praised its scope, comparing it positively to the works of Philip Pullman and Neil Gaiman.

Some reviews gave the novel more mixed reviews. The Los Angeles Times found the novel's focus on storytelling and multiple layers of meaning to be compelling, but criticized the novel's romantic elements as "melodramatic and contrived". Kirkus Reviews praised Wilson's ambition but believed the novel to be slow-paced and bloated.

Awards 
The novel won the 2013 World Fantasy Award for Best Novel. It was nominated for the 2013 Locus Award for Best First Novel, as well as for the Hammett Prize (2012), the John W. Campbell Memorial Award (2013), Grand Prix de l'Imaginaire for Best Foreign Novel (2014), Women's Prize for Fiction (Longlist, 2013), the Center for Fiction First Novel Prize (2012), and the Goodreads Choice Award for Fantasy (2012).

References

2012 American novels
2012 fantasy novels
Cyberpunk novels
World Fantasy Award for Best Novel-winning works
Grove Press books
Jinn in popular culture
Novels set in the Middle East